Elena Konstantinovna Ragozhina ((14 October 1957–2 March 2014) was a Moscow-born publisher, head of Russian Media House, director of charitable foundation Chance for Life.

Biography 

Elena Ragozhina was born in Moscow on 14 October 1957.  In 1974, she finished Moscow School No. 3, a German-language specialist school (now School No. 1249).  In 1979, she graduated with honours from the Moscow State Automobile and Road Technical University with a degree in Engineering Design. In 1979–1988, she worked as a researcher at the All-Union Research Institute for Construction and Road Machinery. In 1995–2000, she taught Economics at MADI; in 1998 she defended her thesis entitled "Economic Demand Chain Management Methods – the Use of New Technology", and was awarded her PhD in Economics (Candidate of Economic Sciences). Ragozhina died in London on 4 March 2014.

Great Britain

In 2000, she moved with her family to Britain, and headed the London office of the Russian bank SDM.  She became the co-owner of a Russian-language newspaper, which she sold two years later.  In 2003, she began publishing the monthly magazine, New Style, a Russian-language publication partly in English (the magazine was originally published under the title Lady Info and renamed in 2004), and in 2005, she began publishing the weekly newspaper Pulse UK. As a publisher, she has hosted annual events which have been attended by all of London's high-profile Russian-speaking residents. Her guests have included numerous famous people who have given interviews to New Style Magazine.  Over the past 10 years more than 500 interviews by Elena Ragozhina have been published.

Philanthropy

In 2005–2009, she was a director of Diema’s Dream, a London-based charitable foundation set up by Mary Dudley to provide support for orphaned children with physical and learning difficulties. In 2009, she co-founded the Chance for Life charitable foundation with her colleague Olga Makharinskaya.  In recent years she has worked closely with the Maria’s Children Center in Moscow, an arts rehabilitation centre founded by the artist Maria Yeliseyeva, bringing together around 300 children from several Moscow children's homes and correctional boarding schools with various learning difficulties, including developmental delays and cerebral palsy. For eight years she has put on charitable balls and the funds (over £400,000) raised at auctions during these events have been used for rehabilitation and educational programmes for orphaned children.

Publications
Featured interviews:
 Kaas chante Piaf
 Naomie Harris – 21st century Bond girl
 The Road to Fame: Miss London Amy Willerton
 Biographer of Jerusalem: Simon Sebag Montefiore
 I am very proud that I am a Romanov
 Ian Paice: Deep Purple’s legendary drummer
 Love and Children: Natalia Vodianova’s London Ball
 Jeff Fahey: «The door is open for anyone»
 Raymond Blanc – England’s celebrated Frenchman
 Colorful world of Matthew Williamson
 Perfume haute couture: Roja Dove
 Arnaud Bamberger – 33 years with Cartier
 Dmitry Khvorostovsky: best baritone of the age
 Yuri Bashmet: You must have charisma on stage
 From new names to Crescendo: Denis Matsuev
 Duchess of Abercorn and other Pushkin descendants
 Lord Giddens on climate change, politicians, and corruption

Mention in the British press:
 Independent "The arrival of the east European media"
 The World: Insider's view – Russia
 Daily Telegraph "When silence is golden"
 Daily Telegraph "Ruthless, stylish and rich, but what emigrés hire first is a bodyguard"

References

External links 
 UK charity ASHA Centre
 Author's profile in New Style Magazine
 Chance for Life/About Us

1957 births
2014 deaths
Russian publishers (people)